Kim Hyo-su  is a South Korean long-distance runner. In 2017, he competed in the men's marathon at the 2017 World Championships in Athletics held in London, United Kingdom. He finished in 59th place.

References

External links 
 

Living people
Year of birth missing (living people)
Place of birth missing (living people)
South Korean male long-distance runners
South Korean male marathon runners
World Athletics Championships athletes for South Korea